Schulthess is a surname. Notable people with the surname include:

Anna Pestalozzi-Schulthess (1738–1815), Swiss educator and philanthropist
Barbara Schulthess (1745–1818), Swiss Salonnière
Edmund Schulthess (1868–1944), Swiss politician 
Walter Schulthess (1894–1971), Swiss conductor and composer
Wilhelm Schulthess (1855–1917), Swiss internist and pediatrician